Portnashangan is a townland in County Westmeath, Ireland.

Portnashangan is one of 8 townlands of the civil parish of Portnashangan in the barony of Corkaree in the Province of Leinster. 
About half of the eastern boundary of the townland includes a strip of Scragh Bog approximately 50m wide.

The neighbouring townlands are: Ballynafid, Knightswood and Rathlevanagh to the north, Loughanstown to the east and Ballynagall, County Westmeath|]] and Culleen More to the south.

In the 1911 census of Ireland there were 17 houses and 67 inhabitants in the townland.

References

External links
Map of Portnashangan townland at openstreetmap.org
Portnashangan at the IreAtlas Townland Data Base
Portnashangan at Townlands.ie
Portnashangan at The Placenames Database of Ireland Department of Arts, Heritage and the Gaeltacht

Townlands of County Westmeath